Asansol Uttar Assembly constituency is an assembly constituency in Paschim Bardhaman district in the Indian state of West Bengal.

Overview
As per orders of the Delimitation Commission, No. 281 Asansol Uttar Assembly constituency covers Ward nos. 13-15, 20-31, 40-55, 76 of Asansol Municipal Corporation. 

Asansol Uttar assembly segment is part of No. 40 Asansol (Lok Sabha constituency).

Members of Legislative Assembly

Election results

1951-1972
In 1972, Niranjan Dihidar of Communist Party of India won the seat. In 1969 and 1971, Dr. Lokesh Ghosh of CPI (M) won the seat. In 1967, Gopika Ranjan Mitra of Congress won the seat. In 1962, Bijoy Pal of CPI won. In 1957, it was won by Shibdas Ghatak of Congress. In independent India's first election in 1951, Atindra Nath Bose of Forward Bloc (Ruikar) won the seat defeating Yogendranath Roy of Congress.

1977-2006
In 2006 state assembly elections. Prativa Ranjan Mukherjee of the Communist Party of India (Marxist) (CPI (M)) won the Asansol seat defeating his nearest rival Kalyan Banerjee of the Trinamool Congress. Contests in most years were multi cornered but only winners and runners are being mentioned. In 2001, Kalyan Banerjee had defeated Goutam Roy Choudhuri of CPI (M). In 1996, Tapas Banerjee of Congress had defeated Goutam Roy Choudhury. In 1991, Goutam Roy Choudhury had won the seat defeating Bajrangi Gupta of the Bharatiya Janata Party (BJP). In 1987, Prabuddha Laha of Congress had defeated Goutam Roy Choudhury. In 1982, Bejoy Pal of CPI (M) defeated his nearest rival Sukumar Banerjee of Congress. In 1977,  Haradhan Roy of CPI (M) defeated Gopika Ranjan Mitra of Congress.

2011

.# Swing calculated on Congress+Trinamool Congress vote percentages in 2006 taken together.

2016

 #Joint candidate of CPI(M), CPI, JD(U), RJD, NCP and INC. As the CPI(M) contested the previous election, the performance of this candidate is based on the previous election

2021

References

Politics of Paschim Bardhaman district
Assembly constituencies of West Bengal
Asansol